Matej Fras (born 3 October 1976) is a retired Slovenian football midfielder.

References

1976 births
Living people
Slovenian footballers
NK Mura players
NK Beltinci players
NK Križevci players
Association football midfielders
Slovenian expatriate footballers
Expatriate footballers in Croatia
Slovenian expatriate sportspeople in Croatia
Slovenian PrvaLiga players